Ephippia (singular: ephippium) are winter or dry-season eggs of the various species of small crustacean in the order Cladocera (within the Branchiopoda); they are provided with an extra shell layer, which preserves and protects the resting stages inside from harsh environmental conditions until the more favorable times, such as spring, when the reproductive cycle is able to take place once again. Ephippia are part of the back of a mother carrying them until they are fully developed. After molting, the ephippium stays in the water, or in the soil of dried puddles, small ponds, and vernal pools. The resting stages are often called eggs, but are in fact embryos with arrested development. Ephippia can rest for many years before the embryo resumes development upon an appropriate hatching stimulus.

See also
 Bythotrephes longimanus (invasive species)
 Cercopagis pengoi (invasive species)
 Daphnia
 Daphnia longispina Daphnia lumholtzi (invasive species)
 Daphnia magna (large species)
 Daphnia pulex (small, most common)
 Moina'' (smallest)

References

Further reading

External links

Branchiopoda
Fishkeeping
Freshwater crustaceans